USS Direct was a name used more than once by the United States Navy in naming its ships:

 , launched 25 April 1942 by Dravo Corporation, Pittsburgh, Pennsylvania.
 , launched 27 May 1953 by Hiltebrant Dry Dock Co., Kingston, New York.

References 

United States Navy ship names